The Girl Hunters (1963) is a British crime drama film directed by Roy Rowland and adapted from the 1962 Mickey Spillane pulp novel of the same name. Exteriors were shot on location in New York with studio scenes in London.

Spillane stars as private detective Mike Hammer, one of the few occasions in film history in which an author of a popular literary hero has portrayed his own character. The film also stars Shirley Eaton, Lloyd Nolan and columnist Hy Gardner as himself.

Producer Robert Fellows intended to follow the film with Spillane's The Snake, but the second film was never produced.

Plot
Ever since his assistant Velda went missing, private detective Mike Hammer has been drinking and he is now homeless. Although Hammer hasn't worked a case in seven years, his old police friend Capt. Pat Chambers asks for his assistance on a job. Chambers and Hammer were both in love with Velda, which had ended their friendship. The case involves a senator who has been murdered.

Hammer is needed to talk with Richie Cole, a dying sailor who refuses to speak with anybody else. According to federal agent Art Rickerby, not only has Richie been shot by the same gun recently used to kill a politician, he is actually an undercover federal agent.

Hammer's investigation leads to Laura Knapp, the late senator's widow. She is beautiful and seductive, but Hammer does not trust her. He learns that they are caught in the fallout from a network of spies operating during World War II. Now a killer nicknamed the Dragon is trying to silence people who had information about the spy operation. Hammer finds and kills the Dragon. He confronts Laura with his suspicions about her involvement. Laura fires a shotgun that Hammer had rigged to backfire in order to test her loyalty. It is not clear if Velda is still alive.

Cast
 Mickey Spillane as Mike Hammer
 Shirley Eaton as Laura Knapp
 Scott Peters as Police Captain Pat Chambers
 Guy Kingsley Poynter as Dr. Larry Snyder
 Charles Farrell as Joe Grissi
 Kim Tracy as Nurse
 Hy Gardner as himself - The Columnist
 Lloyd Nolan as Federal Agent Arthur Rickerby
 Benny Lee as Nat Drutman
 Murray Kash as Richie Cole
 Bill Nagy as Georgie
 Hal Galili as a thug with an ice pick

Production
Spillane recalled meeting crime figure Billy Hill in London and invited him to the film set.  According to Spillane, Hill provided firearms that were used in the film. Spillane also noted that the producers surrounded him with actors who were shorter than he was.

References

External links
 
 

1963 films
1963 crime drama films
British crime drama films
British neo-noir films
British detective films
Films directed by Roy Rowland
Films based on American novels
Films based on crime novels
Films based on works by Mickey Spillane
Reboot films
Films shot in London
Films shot in New York City
1960s English-language films
1960s British films
Mike Hammer (character) films